Taylor-Johnson is a surname and may refer to:
 Aaron Taylor-Johnson (born 1990), British actor
 Sam Taylor-Johnson (née Taylor-Woods; born 1967), British filmmaker, photographer and visual artist

Other
 Taylor–Johnson Temperament Analysis, a personality test

Compound surnames
English-language surnames
Surnames of English origin